Gabriela Dabrowski and Sharon Fichman were the defending champions, but both competed with different partners. Dabrowski competed with Marie-Ève Pelletier, while Fichman competed with Sun Shengnan and both faced each other in the semifinals with Dabrowski and Pelletier winning.

Dabrowski then successfully defended her title partnering up with Pelletier and defeating Tímea Babos and Jessica Pegula in the final 7–5, 6–7(5–7), [10–4].

Seeds

Draw

Draw

References
 Main Draw

Tevlin Women's Challenger
Tevlin Women's Challenger